Andrade Corner (formerly, Talamantes) is an unincorporated community in the Sierra Pelona Mountains, Los Angeles County, California.

References

Unincorporated communities in Los Angeles County, California
Sierra Pelona Ridge
Unincorporated communities in California